Cille is a Turkish animated series that airs on the TRT Çocuk broadcast channel.

The 12 Legendary Cilles are (with Character first followed by the element): 
Behmut - Water
Alşimist - Water
Harkas - Water
Buzor - Earth
Dessas - Earth
Nirumend - Earth
Semender - Fire
Anka - Air
Aydakar - Fire
Senmurv - Fire
Peleng - Air
Umay - Air

Non Legendary Cilles
Akper - Air
Lenduha - Earth
Sureta - Water and Copy
Mazmaza - Water
Anut - Earth
Sebenta - Earth
Cariha - Fire Darkness and Lightning
Kabkaba - Fire and Darkness
Suban - Fire and Darkness
Akuran - Earth
Şarkan - Earth
Susmar - Earth and Lightning
Murassa - Earth

External links
Official website

Turkish animated television series
2011 Turkish television series debuts
2010s animated television series
Computer-animated television series
Turkish Radio and Television Corporation original programming